Club América has four communication methods, which consist of television, radio, journalism, specifically a physical and digital copy of a magazine, and an official smart phone and tablet app.

Zona Aguila

Radio
The radio program broadcasts in Mexico, with interviews, reports, stories and special guests. It is hosted by Eduardo Luna, Ara Piloyán and Gerardo Ramos. It broadcasts from 10:00 to 11:00 AM on W Radio in Mexico City.

Television
Raul Sarmiento and Fernando Jesus Torres host the show Zona Aguila, which broadcasts news, stories, and interviews on the club. It broadcasts every Monday in Mexico at 19:00 on the Televisa Deportes Network.

Pasión América Magazine
The physical copy of the magazine is sold in kiosks and sport stores in Mexico, including the official club stores. A digital copy is also offered for computers and tablets such as the iPad, available only for those who are a paid member of the Américanista program.

Digital App
An official Club América app is available for mobile phones such as the iPhone, BlackBerry and Android phones on their respective mobile app stores for free. The app is also available as a universal application for the Apple iPad, as well as the iPod Touch.

References

Club América